Jesse Viertel Memorial Airport , also known as Jesse P. Viertel Airport, is a city-owned public-use airport located three miles (5 km) southeast of the central business district of Boonville, a city in Cooper County, Missouri, United States. It is home to the Daniel Boone Flying Club, which serves central Missouri.

Although most U.S. airports use the same three-letter location identifier for the FAA and IATA, Jesse Viertel Memorial Airport is assigned VER by the FAA but has no designation from the IATA (which assigned VER to General Heriberto Jara International Airport in Veracruz, Mexico).

"On November 30, 2014, about 0857 central standard time (CST), a Bellanca model 17-30A single-engine airplane, N6629V, was substantially damaged when it collided with terrain during landing approach to runway 36 at Jesse Viertel Memorial Airport (VER), Boonville, Missouri. The commercial pilot was fatally injured and his three passengers were seriously injured".

Facilities and aircraft 
For the 12-month period ending May 31, 2006, the airport had 9,080 aircraft operations, an average of 24 per day: 92% general aviation (8,380), 4% air taxi (400), 3% military (300).

References

External links 
Tig Air Aviation, the airport's fixed-base operator (FBO)
Daniel Boone Flying Club

Airports in Missouri
Buildings and structures in Cooper County, Missouri